The Fișer is a left tributary of the river Cozd in Romania. It discharges into the Cozd in Rupea.

References

Rivers of Romania
Rivers of Brașov County